The Testament of Cornelius Gulden is a 1932 German drama film directed by E. W. Emo and starring Magda Schneider, Georg Alexander, and Theo Lingen. It is based on the 1930 novel of the same title by Ludwig von Wohl.

The film's sets were designed by the art director Max Heilbronner.

Cast

References

Bibliography

External links 
 

1932 films
1932 drama films
German drama films
German black-and-white films
Films of the Weimar Republic
1930s German-language films
Films directed by E. W. Emo
Films based on German novels
1930s German films